The 1987 Southeastern Conference baseball tournament was held at Foley Field in Athens, Georgia, from May 14 through 17.  won the tournament and earned the Southeastern Conference's automatic bid to the 1987 NCAA Tournament.

Regular season results

Tournament 

 * indicates extra innings.

All-Tournament Team

See also 
 College World Series
 NCAA Division I Baseball Championship
 Southeastern Conference baseball tournament

References 

 SECSports.com All-Time Baseball Tournament Results
 Boydsworld 1987 Standings
 SECSports.com All-Tourney Team Lists

Tournament
Southeastern Conference Baseball Tournament
Southeastern Conference baseball tournament
Southeastern Conference baseball tournament
Baseball competitions in Georgia (U.S. state)
College sports tournaments in Georgia (U.S. state)
Sports in Athens, Georgia